Professor Chandra Richard de Silva is a Sri Lankan academic, historian and author. A lecturer of history at the Old Dominion University, de Silva has written a number of books on Sri Lankan history.

Early life and family
After his secondary education at St. Peter's College, Bambalapitiya, Chandra De Silva was educated at the University of Ceylon from where he received a BA degree in history in 1962. He received a Ph.D degree in 1968 from the University of London.

Career
De Silva started teaching at the University of Ceylon, Peradeniya in 1963. He was dean of the Faculty of Arts, University of Peradeniya from 1978 to 1981. He became a professor of history at the university in 1984. He was visiting professor of history and Asian studies at Bowdoin College between 1989 and 1991. He was chair of history at Indiana State University between 1991 and 1998. He joined the Old Dominion University in 1998 as its chair of history. He became dean of the university's College of Arts and Letters in June 2003. He is currently vice provost for faculty and program development at the university.

De Silva was awarded a Diplome de Langue Francaise from the Alliance Francaise de Paris in 1987.

Works
De Silva has written the following books.

 The Portuguese in Ceylon 1617-1683 (1972, Cave)
 Sri Lanka: A History (1997, Vikas)
 Portuguese Encounters with Sri Lanka and the Maldives: Translated Texts from the Age of the Discoveries (2009, Ashgate)

References

Academic staff of the University of Ceylon (Peradeniya)
Academic staff of the University of Peradeniya
Academic staff of the University of Sri Lanka (Peradeniya)
Alumni of the University of Ceylon
Alumni of the University of London
Bowdoin College faculty
Indiana State University faculty
Living people
Old Dominion University faculty
Writers from Norfolk, Virginia
20th-century Sri Lankan historians
Sinhalese historians
21st-century Sri Lankan historians
Year of birth missing (living people)
Historians of Sri Lanka